Edosa cheligera is a moth of the family Tineidae. It was described by László Anthony Gozmány in 1970 and is found in Zimbabwe.

This species has a wingspan of 14 mm, its head is light yellow, antennae white, thorax and forewings ochreous stramineous (straw coloured) without pattern. Hindwings are whitish grey.

References

Moths described in 1970
Perissomasticinae
Moths of Sub-Saharan Africa
Lepidoptera of Zimbabwe